CHNV-FM is an alternative rock radio station broadcasting at 103.5 FM in Nelson, British Columbia, Canada and is also heard at 91.9 FM in Crawford Bay with the call sign CHNV-FM-1. The station is branded as 103.5 The Bridge and is owned by the Vista Broadcast Group.

History
The station originally began in 2005 as a rebroadcaster of CKQR-FM, formerly known as (BK Radio and Mountain FM) in Castlegar.

On August 19, 2008, Vista applied to change the authorized contours of its transmitter CHNV-FM in Nelson by increasing the average effective radiated power from 84 watts to 1,100 watts (maximum effective radiated power of 2,400 watts), by increasing the effective antenna height to 376 metres and by relocating the transmitter. This was approved on October 21, 2008.

At midnight on June 11, 2010 it split off from being a rebroadcaster and moved to its own programming. It was still branded as Mountain FM and continued to have a mainly active rock format, though with more emphasis on Indie music.

September 3, 2010 saw a format change to adult album alternative, and a rebranding to 103.5 The Bridge.

On May 30, 2014, CHNV flipped to variety hits as 103.5 Juice FM.

In February 2020, CHNV flipped to CHR/Top 40 format and as 103.5 The Bridge.

As of 2021, CHNV has an alternative rock format.

References

External links
103.5 The Bridge
 
 

Hnv
Hnv
Hnv
Radio stations established in 2005
2005 establishments in British Columbia
Nelson, British Columbia